Justin Antonius Lonwijk (born 21 December 1999) is a Dutch professional footballer who plays as a midfielder for Ukrainian Premier League club Dynamo Kyiv.

Club career

Jong PSV
He made his professional debut in the Eerste Divisie for Jong PSV on 13 January 2017 in a game against FC Den Bosch.

Utrecht
On 29 May 2019, he signed for Utrecht on a three-year contract, until 2022. Utrecht manager John van den Brom selected Lonwijk for the starting line-up in the two tiers against Zrinjski Mostar in the UEFA Europa League qualifiers. His Eredivisie-debut followed on 4 August 2019, where he was a starter in the 4–2 away win over ADO Den Haag.

Viborg
On 25 January 2021, Lonwijk joined Danish 1st Division club Viborg FF on loan from Utrecht for the rest of the season with an option to buy. On 1 June 2021 was announced that they had exercised this purchase option. He signed a contract in Denmark until 2024.

Dynamo Kyiv
On 22 September 2022 Lonwijk signed a five-year contract with Ukrainian Premier League club Dynamo Kyiv. Viborg FF claimed he was sold for a record transfer fee (in the history of Viborg FF). Lonwijk signed with Dynamo Kyiv during a Russian invasion of Ukraine.

Personal life
Born in the Netherlands, Lonwijk is of Surinamese descent.

He is the oldest brother of Nigel Lonwijk, who plays for English League One club Plymouth Argyle on loan from English Premier League club Wolverhampton Wanderers, whilst his younger sister Jayden plays tennis.

Honours
Viborg
Danish 1st Division: 2020–21

References

External links
 
 
 

1999 births
Dutch sportspeople of Surinamese descent
Footballers from Tilburg
Living people
Dutch footballers
Dutch expatriate footballers
Netherlands youth international footballers
Willem II (football club) players
Jong PSV players
FC Utrecht players
Jong FC Utrecht players
Viborg FF players
FC Dynamo Kyiv players
Eerste Divisie players
Eredivisie players
Ukrainian Premier League players
Danish 1st Division players
Danish Superliga players
Association football midfielders
Dutch expatriate sportspeople in Denmark
Expatriate men's footballers in Denmark
Expatriate footballers in Ukraine
Dutch expatriate sportspeople in Ukraine